Prem Shakti is a 1994 Hindi-language film directed by Shibu Mitra, starring Govinda, Karishma Kapoor in lead roles. Other cast includes Shakti Kapoor, Kader Khan, Raza Murad, Puneet Issar and Nitish Bharadwaj. It was previously titled as "Jab Jab Pyar Hua".

Plot
Ganga (Govinda) and Gauri (Karishma Kapoor) are in love, but the young lovers are not permitted to marry. One night they run away, finding themselves in the den of an evil sage (Puneet Issar), who is trying to coerce the Lord of the Snakes (Nitish Bharadwaj) into giving him a gem he needs to make the nectar which will give him immortality. This event can only happen on this one night of the full moon, which comes only once ever twenty-five years. But the young lovers defend the Snake and defeat the sage's plan. The angry sage turns Gauri to a stone and unable to withstand the shock, Ganga passes away. But the magical snake saves the day by proclaiming that Ganga will be reborn, still with love in his heart for Gauri, and twenty-five years later they will find each other again. How will fate play out to bring the lovers together? Who will win the supernatural battle that spans many years and several reincarnations? The film had an average run, it marked the beginning of Karishma and Govinda as co-stars who went on to give many hit movies together.

Cast
 Govinda as Ganga / Krishna
 Karishma Kapoor as Gauri / Karishma
 Shakti Kapoor as Hoshiyar Singh
 Kader Khan as Romeo
 Raza Murad as 
 Puneet Issar as Mahabali Tantrik
 Nitish Bharadwaj as Naagraj
 Sulabha Deshpande as Ganga's Mother
 Satyendra Kapoor as Gauri's Father
 Tiku Talsania as Mannequin Maker
 Sameer Khakhar as Kewelchand 
 Viju Khote as Delpotiya

Music

References

External links 
 

1994 films
1990s Hindi-language films
Films about reincarnation
Films scored by Raamlaxman
Films directed by Shibu Mitra